The generic sensor format (GSF) is a file format used for storing bathymetry data, such as that gathered by a multibeam echosounder.
The format was created by Scott Ferguson and Daniel A. Chayes.

The file format specifications and C source code for a library to read and write GSF files are available from Leidos, who maintain both the format specification and the source code. The GSF library source code is published under the GNU Lesser General Public License, version 2.1.

Usage
The following software packages support GSF:
 Teledyne CARIS HIPS and SIPS
 EIVA NaviEdit
  Fledermaus
 MB-System
 QINSy
 BeamworX AutoClean
 WASSP
 Qimera
 HYPACK
 ISS-2000
 SABER
 PFMABE (open source)
 MB-System Seafloor Mapping Software (open source)

References

External links
 

Computer file formats
Open formats